Robert B. Moberly is Dean Emeritus and Professor of Law at the University of Arkansas School of Law.  His scholarship focuses primarily on dispute resolution.

Education
Moberly received BS and JD degrees from the University of Wisconsin. He previously taught at University of Illinois, Maurer School of Law, University of Louvain, the Polish Academy of Sciences, and the University of Florida Levin College of Law, where he founded the Institute for Dispute Resolution.

Publications

Selected articles
 The New Arkansas Appellate-Mediation Program, Arkansas Law Review, with Laura E. Levine, (2008)
 Labor-Management Relations during the Clinton Administration, Hofstra Labor & Employment Law Journal (2006)
 Introduction: The Arkansas Law Review Symposium on Alternative Dispute Resolution, Arkansas Law Review, with Judith Kilpatrick, (2001)
 Dispute Resolution in the Law School Curriculum: Opportunities and Challenges, Florida Law Review (1998)
 Mediator Gag Rules: Is it Ethical for Mediators to Evaluate or Advise?, South Texas Law Review (1997)

Awards
 Center for Public Resources Award for Outstanding Alternative Dispute Resolution Scholarship, 1984
 Member of the Executive Committee of the National Academy of Arbitrators, 2009-2010 
 Member of the International Society for Labor Law and Social Security 
 Chair of Association of American Law Schools Section on Alternative Dispute Resolution, 1982-1985
 Former Chair of Association of American Law Schools Section on Labor & Employment Law
 Principal Investigator for the Bureau of Labor-Management Relations of the United States Department of Labor, 1987
 Principal Investigator for the United States Department of Agriculture, 1998-1999
 Commissioner of the Arkansas Alternative Dispute Resolution Commission, 2006-2011

References

External links
 http://law.uark.edu/directory/?user=moberly
 http://www.naarb.org/officials.html#exec_com
 

American legal scholars
Year of birth missing (living people)
Living people